Tashtun is a village in the Meghri Municipality of the Syunik Province in Armenia.

Demographics 
The Statistical Committee of Armenia reported its population was 134 in 2010, down from 170 at the 2001 census.

Gallery

References 

Populated places in Syunik Province